KWYI (106.9 FM, "The Beach Radio 106.9 Kona 102.7 Hilo") is a radio station licensed to serve Kawaihae, Hawaii. The station is owned by Resonate Hawaii LLC.  It airs a Hot Adult Contemporary format featuring Oldies music on the weekends.

The station was assigned the KWYI call letters by the Federal Communications Commission on June 4, 1990.

KWYI is now "The Beach Radio 106.9 Kona 102.7 Hilo".

References

External links

WYI
Hot adult contemporary radio stations in the United States